Finnish Defence Forces International Centre FINCENT is a unit of Finnish Defense Forces located in Helsinki. FINCENT organizes courses, seminars and exercises with the European Union, United Nations and NATO.

History 
FINCENT was established in 1969 as the United Nations Training Centre (Finnish: YK-Koulutuskeskus) which was based in Niinisalo. In 2001 the name was changed to Finnish Defence Forces International Centre. In the 2008 re-organization the crisis management operations were handed to the Pori Brigade and the other functions were transferred to Hyrylä. In 2015 FINCENT became part of Finnish National Defence University and was relocated to Helsinki. The FINCENT field exercise area still works in Niinisalo.

Sources 
Finnish Defence Forces International Centre FINCENT The Finnish Defense Forces

Military of Finland